During World War II, Nazi Germany developed many missile and precision-guided munition systems.

These included the first cruise missile, the  first short-range ballistic missile, the first guided surface-to-air missiles, and the first anti-ship missiles.

Organisations 
 Peenemünde rocket test site

People involved
 Wernher von Braun
 Walter Dornberger
 Walter Thiel
 Max Kramer
 Herbert A. Wagner

Models

Surface-to-surface missiles 
The V-1, which may be seen as the first cruise missile, was used operationally against London  and Antwerp. The V-2 ballistic missile was used operationally against London, Antwerp, and other targets. The Rheinbote was fired against Antwerp.
 V-1 flying bomb
 V-2 rocket
 Rheinbote
 A4b

Surface-to-air missiles 
Germany developed a number of surface-to-air missile systems, none of which was used operationally:
 Enzian (Gentian)
 Rheintochter (Rhine Daughter) -  (an air-to-air variant was also planned)
 Henschel Hs 117 Schmetterling (Butterfly) - radio-controlled (an air-to-air variant was also planned)
 Wasserfall (Waterfall)
 Feuerlilie (Fire Lily)

Air-to-air missiles 
As with the surface-to-air missiles above, these were never used operationally:
 Ruhrstahl X-4 (actively wire-guided; anti-tank variants of this were also designed, such as the X-7)

Anti-ship missiles 
Anti-ship missiles were used operationally against allied shipping in 1943, notably in the Mediterranean Sea, guided by the Funkgerät FuG 203 Kehl series of MCLOS radio guidance systems aboard the deploying aircraft:
 Fritz X armored, anti-ship gravity PGM
 Henschel Hs 293 air-to-ship, rocket-boosted gliding guided bomb

See also 
List of military aircraft of Germany
List of World War II military aircraft of Germany
List of RLM aircraft designations
List of missiles

References 

 
guided weapons
Peenemünde Army Research Center and Airfield
Guided weapons